Tasali Foods is the second largest snack food company in Saudi Arabia. In 2001, it was acquired by PepsiCo. They now produce Tasali potato chips, as well as distributing other Pepsi brands such as Lay's and Cheetos.

Flavors 
These are Tasali flavors:
 Ketchup
 Chili
 Chili-Ketchup
 Cumin & Lemon
 Flamin' Hot: Black Lemon

Former 
 Chili Cheese
 BBQ
 Cheddar Cheese
 Yogurt and Herbs
 Popcorn: Butter
 Popcorn: Cheddar Cheese

Notes

References

External links
News about the purchase

Food and drink companies of Saudi Arabia
PepsiCo subsidiaries
Saudi Arabian brands